Midea may refer to:

 Midea Group (美的集团), a Chinese electrical appliance manufacturer 
 Midea, Greece, a Greek town
 Midea (Argolid), a citadel in the town of the same name
 Midea or Mideia, name of four figures in Greek mythology
 Midea, a genus of mites in the suborder Prostigmata
 Midea (moth), formerly a genus of moths (now Arsacia)
 Midea, formerly a genus of butterflies (now Anthocharis)

See also
 Media (disambiguation)
 Mideia (Boeotia), a town of ancient Boeotia